Smile Vojdanov (originally spelled in older Bulgarian orthography: Смиле Войдановъ; February 1, 1872 – March 4, 1958) was a Bulgarian and Macedonian revolutionary, member and voivode of the Internal Macedonian Revolutionary Organization, and longtime activist in the Macedonian People's League in emigration.

Biography

Vojdanov was born in Laktinje, a village near the city of Kičevo. He studied in Ohrid, as well as at the Kičevo Monastery where he remained until 1890. In 1892, he worked as a teacher in his native village, and later from 1894 to 1897 as a pa-drone in Slivovo. The following year Hristo Uzunov and Metodi Patchev introduced Smile Vojdanov into the VMRO.

In 1901, Vojdanov began forming committees of the organization. During the Ilinden Uprising, Vojdanov and his group were active in the area of Gorna Debarca. After the uprising was suppressed, Vojdanov headed to Bulgaria. In March 1905 he entered Macedonia with his group and Aleksandar Protogerov. During the Balkan Wars, he served with the Macedonian-Adrianople group of volunteers in Bulgarian army. After the war, Petar Chaulev and Vojdanov, together with 189 rebels, returned to their revolutionary activities in Ohrid (now against the new Serbian government).

After World War I, Vojdanov immigrated to America and settled in Pontiac, Michigan, where he started a small business. He joined the management committee of the newspaper Narodna Volja (People's Will). In 1931, he became chairman of the Central Committee of the Macedonian People's League. In 1933, the United States created a special "Committee to Protect Macedonian rights and freedoms", chaired by the writer Stoyan Christowe. The Committee raised the slogan to unite all Bulgarians in America. to struggle for the liberation of Macedonia. This Committee sent a special delegation that consisted of Voydanov, Edward Haskell and Bishop D. Smith, who visited Athens and Belgrade. There he protested the persecution of Bulgarians who remained after World War within Greece and Yugoslavia. During his stay in Sofia the three publicly expressed their dissatisfaction in connection with political killings of leftist political leaders. After the outbreak of World War II he joined the American Slavic Committee, an association of Americans of Slavic origin for protection and promotion of the Slavic population in a military Europe.

Smile Vojdanov died in Pontiac, Michigan on March 4, 1958. The 150th anniversary of his birth was commemorated by Macedonian Americans at his burial site in Pontiac in 2022.

References 

1872 births
1958 deaths
Members of the Internal Macedonian Revolutionary Organization
American people of Macedonian descent
Macedonian emigrants to the United States